The president of the State of Israel (or ) is the head of state of Israel. The position is largely a ceremonial role, with executive power vested in the cabinet led by the prime minister. The incumbent president is Isaac Herzog, who took office on 7 July 2021. Presidents are elected by the Knesset for a single seven-year term.

Election
The President of Israel is elected by an absolute majority in the Knesset, by secret ballot. If no candidate receives an absolute majority of votes in the first or second round of voting, the candidate with the least votes is eliminated in each subsequent round, if needed until only two remain. From 1949 to 2000, the president was elected for a five-year term, and was allowed to serve up to two terms in office. Since 2000, the president serves a single seven-year term.

Any Israeli resident citizen is eligible to run for president. The office falls vacant upon completion of a term, death, resignation, or the decision of three-quarters of the Knesset to remove the president on grounds of misconduct or incapacity. Presidential tenure is not keyed to that of the Knesset, in order to assure continuity in government and the non-partisan character of the office. There is no vice president in the Israeli governmental system. If the president is temporarily incapacitated, or leaves office, the speaker of the Knesset becomes acting president.

The first presidential election took place on 16 February 1949, and the winner was Chaim Weizmann. The second took place in 1951, as at the time presidential terms were linked to the length of the Knesset term (the first Knesset lasted only two years). Another election took place the following year after Weizmann's death.

Since then, elections have been held in 1957, 1962, 1963 (an early election following Yitzhak Ben-Zvi's death), 1968, 1973, 1978, 1983, 1988, 1993, 1998, 2000, 2007, and 2014. Six elections (1951, 1957, 1962, 1968, 1978, and 1988) have taken place with no opposition candidate, although a vote was still held.

Isaac Herzog was elected 11th President on 2 June 2021. His term started on 9 July.

Powers and responsibilities

The powers of the President of Israel are generally equivalent to those held by heads of state in other parliamentary democracies and are largely dictated by Basic Law: The Presidency, which was passed in 1964. The Basic Law: The Government also includes sections on the powers of the president with reference to the government. The president signs every law (except those that pertain to the president's powers) and international or bilateral treaties approved by the Knesset. In addition, the president endorses the credentials of ambassadors and receives the credentials of foreign diplomats, appoints the Governor of the Bank of Israel, the State Comptroller upon recommendation of the Knesset House Committee, members of the Council on Higher Education, the National Academy of Science, the Broadcasting Authority, the Authority to Rehabilitate Prisoners, the Chief Rabbinical Council, the Wolf Foundation, the president of Magen David Adom, the president of the Israel Academy of Sciences and Humanities, and ceremonially appoints the Prime Minister. The president also has the power to pardon or commute the sentences of both soldiers and civilians, and ceremonially appoints judges to courts, including the Supreme Court, after appointment by the Judicial Selection Committee.

In addition, paragraph 29a of The Government basic law also states that the president must consent to the dissolution of the Knesset at the request of the Prime Minister when the government has lost its majority and can therefore no longer function effectively.

Unlike most presidents in parliamentary republics, the President of Israel is not even the nominal chief executive. Basic Law: The Government explicitly vests executive power in the Government (as the Cabinet is officially called). Presidential powers are usually exercised based on the recommendation of appropriate government ministers.

The president's most important role, in practice, is to help lead the process of forming a government. Israel's electoral system and fractured political landscape make it all but impossible for one party to govern alone, let alone win an outright majority of Knesset seats. After each election, the president consults with party leaders to determine who is most likely to command a majority in the Knesset.

Other roles
The president awards the Israel Prize on Yom Ha'atzmaut and the Wolf Prize. The president also serves as the main speaker at the opening ceremonies of the half-yearly Knesset conference, as well as at the annual official ceremonies for Yom Hazikaron and Yom HaShoah.

Presidential backgrounds
Most Israeli presidents were involved in national politics or Zionist activities before taking office. Some were also distinguished in other fields. For example, Chaim Weizmann was a leading research chemist who founded the Weizmann Institute of Science in Rehovot; Zalman Shazar was an author, poet, and journalist; and Chaim Herzog was a military leader, attorney, and diplomat.

The first Israeli presidents were born in the former Russian Empire. The first native-born president, as well as the first with a Sephardi background, was Yitzhak Navon. The first president with a Western European background was Chaim Herzog, who originally came from Belfast, United Kingdom. The first president with a Mizrahi background was Moshe Katsav, who was born in Iran.

Political affiliation
All Israeli presidents from Yitzhak Ben-Zvi to Ezer Weizman were members of, or associated with, the Labor Party and its predecessors, and have been considered politically moderate. Moshe Katsav was the first Likud president. These tendencies were especially significant in the April 1978 election of Labor's Yitzhak Navon, following the inability of the governing Likud coalition to elect its candidate to the presidency. Israeli observers believed that, in counterbalance to Prime Minister Menachem Begin's polarizing leadership, Navon, the country's first president of Sephardi origin, provided Israel with unifying symbolic leadership at a time of great political controversy and upheaval. In 1983, Navon decided to re-enter Labor politics after five years of non-partisan service as president, and Chaim Herzog (previously head of military intelligence and Ambassador of Israel to the United Nations) succeeded him as Israel's sixth president. Likud's Moshe Katsav's victory over Labor's Shimon Peres in 2000 (by secret ballot) was an upset.

Albert Einstein, a Jew, but not an Israeli citizen, was offered the presidency in 1952, but turned it down, stating: "I am deeply moved by the offer from our State of Israel, and at once saddened and ashamed that I cannot accept it. All my life I have dealt with objective matters, hence I lack both the natural aptitude and the experience to deal properly with people and to exercise official functions." Ehud Olmert was reported to be considering offering the presidency to another non-Israeli, Elie Wiesel, but he was said to be "very not interested".

List of presidents of the State of Israel

References

External links
Gov.il: President of the State of Israel Official website
Knesset.gov.il: President of the State of Israel Official website

 
Israel
1949 establishments in Israel